Trawden Forest is a civil parish in the Pendle district of Lancashire, England. It has a population of 2,765, and contains the village of Trawden (formerly called Beardshaw) and the hamlets of Cottontree, Winewall and Wycoller. Boulsworth Hill is a well known local landmark situated within the parish. It takes its name from a medieval royal forest or "chase" which was in the same area.

Trawden was once a township in the ancient parish of Whalley. This became a civil parish in 1866, forming an urban district from 1894.

The parish adjoins the Pendle parishes of Nelson, Colne and Laneshaw Bridge, the Burnley parish of Briercliffe and West Yorkshire.

According to the United Kingdom Census 2011, the parish has a population of 2,765, an increase from 2,580 in the 2001 census.

Media gallery

See also

Listed buildings in Trawden Forest

References
Citations

External links

Map of modern parish boundary at Lancashire County Council website

Civil parishes in Lancashire
Geography of the Borough of Pendle